Samuel Laurence Venuto (November 2, 1927 – July 7, 2014) was an American football running back in the National Football League. He played professionally for the Washington Redskins.

Biography
Venuto was born in Havertown, Pennsylvania, and attended Haverford High School in Haverford Township, Pennsylvania. He played college football at Guilford College. In 1952, he played for the Washington Redskins.

References

External links
 databaseFootball.com
 Pro-Football.com

1927 births
2014 deaths
People from Haverford Township, Pennsylvania
American football running backs
American people of Italian descent
Washington Redskins players
Players of American football from Pennsylvania
Guilford Quakers football players
Sportspeople from Delaware County, Pennsylvania